HD 170069 (HR 6922) is a solitary star in the southern constellation Telescopium. It has an apparent magnitude of 5.68, allowing it to be faintly seen with the naked eye. HD 170069 was designated as Tau Telescopii (τ Telescopii) before Benjamin Apthorp Gould dropped the title.

HD 170069 has a stellar classification of K2 III, indicating that it is a red giant. It has 4.08 times the mass of the Sun but has expanded to 23.69 times its girth.

References

K-type giants
Telescopium (constellation)
Telescopii, 15
CD-47 12319
170069
090662
6922